Horace Kolimba (29 December 1939 – 13 March 1997) was a Tanzanian CCM politician.

References

1939 births
1997 deaths
Chama Cha Mapinduzi politicians